Solari may refer to:

 Solari (surname)
 Solari (village), a village in Gabrovo Municipality, Bulgaria
 Solari, a minor character in the TV series Xena: Warrior Princess
 Solari Inc., a company founded by Catherine Austin Fitts
 Solari departure board, a popular designation for a flap display board named after the manufacturer, Solari di Udine
 Solari Bay, an embayment in Antarctica